The Belgian Bowl XV was played in 2002 and was won by the Brussels Tigers. This was the last time a team of the LFFAB won the Belgian Bowl.

Playoffs

References

External links
Official Belgian Bowl website

American football in Belgium
Belgian Bowl
Belgian Bowl